Okechukwu Precious Nwala is the Anglican Bishop of Etche in Nigeria: Etche being one of nine dioceses in the  Anglican Province of the Niger Delta, itself one of 14 within the Church of Nigeria.

Notes

Anglican bishops of Etche
21st-century Anglican bishops in Nigeria
Year of birth missing (living people)
Living people